John Wesley Mallard House is a historic home located near Faison, Duplin County, North Carolina. It was built about 1886, and is a two-story, three bay by two bay, Greek Revival / Italianate style frame I-house dwelling. It features a one-story, full-width front porch with a hipped roof.

It was listed on the National Register of Historic Places in 2004.

References

Houses on the National Register of Historic Places in North Carolina
Greek Revival houses in North Carolina
Italianate architecture in North Carolina
Houses completed in 1886
Houses in Duplin County, North Carolina
National Register of Historic Places in Duplin County, North Carolina